Joseph "Scott" Goodwin (born November 1, 1990) is a retired American soccer player who played as a goalkeeper.

Career

College & Youth
Goodwin played four years of college soccer at the University of North Carolina between 2009 and 2012. Goodwin was part of four straight ACC Regular Season Championships, the 2011 ACC Tournament Championship, four straight NCAA Tournament Appearances, three consecutive NCAA College Cup Appearances, and the 2011 NCAA Men's Division I National Championship.

While at college, Goodwin appeared for USL PDL clubs Reading United AC in 2010 and Carolina Dynamo in 2011 and 2012.

Professional
Goodwin signed with NASL club Carolina RailHawks on January 29, 2014. He made his professional debut on June 14, 2014 in the US Open Cup against Chivas USA.

Goodwin joined USL club Louisville City FC on March 16, 2015.

On May 27, 2016, Goodwin announced his retirement from soccer upon his acceptance to study at Harvard Medical School.

References

1990 births
Living people
American soccer players
North Carolina Tar Heels men's soccer players
Reading United A.C. players
North Carolina Fusion U23 players
North Carolina FC players
Louisville City FC players
Association football goalkeepers
Soccer players from North Carolina
USL League Two players
North American Soccer League players
USL Championship players
Harvard Medical School alumni